The Płonka is a river in central Poland.

Płonka may also refer to:

Places 
Płonka, Lublin Voivodeship
Płonka, West Pomeranian Voivodeship

People 
Beata Kempa (née Płonka, born 1966), Polish politician
Eric Plonka, member of Yakuza (band)
Ewa Plonka (born 1982), Polish opera singer
Gerlind Plonka, German mathematician
Jan Płonka (1920–2003), Polish skier
Marek Płonka, member of the Poland national rugby union team
Michał Płonka (born 1992), Polish footballer